Justin Theodore McLaughlin (March 24, 1912 – September 27, 1964) was a relief pitcher in Major League Baseball who played from  through  for the Boston Red Sox.

A native of Brighton, Massachusetts, McLaughlin attended Boston College. In a three-season major league career, McLaughlin posted a 10.27 ERA in 16 appearances for the Red Sox, including four strikeouts, 17 walks, 42 hits allowed and  innings of work, without gaining a decision or save. In 1935, McLaughlin played for Falmouth in the Cape Cod Baseball League. He died in 1964 in Cambridge, Massachusetts at age 52.

See also
Boston Red Sox all-time roster

External links
Baseball Reference
Baseball Almanac
Jud McLaughlin biography from Society for American Baseball Research (SABR)

References

Boston Red Sox players
Major League Baseball pitchers
Boston College Eagles baseball players
Falmouth Commodores players
Cape Cod Baseball League players (pre-modern era)
Baseball players from Massachusetts
1912 births
1964 deaths